Innocent Ntsume (born 7 July 1980) is a South African professional footballer who plays as a midfielder.

Career
Ntsume began his professional career in 1999 with Jomo Cosmos, before moving to FC AK in August 2008. Ntsume was released from his two-year contract with FC AK in January 2009, due to financial reasons.

References

1980 births
Living people
South African soccer players
Jomo Cosmos F.C. players
F.C. AK players
Association football midfielders